Srinivasa IV Rao Sahib was twelfth ruler of the Jagir of Arni of British Raj during the reign (1931 – 1948).

Early life
Srinivasara Rao Sahib was born in 1904 to 11th Jagirdar of Arni jagir Raja Thirumala IV Rao Sahib in North Arcot, Madras Presidency. He competed his school education at Bishop Cotton High School, Bangalore. He completed his college studies in Newington College and Madras Christian College and became a barrister. He married Sushila Purnaiah, who was the daughter of 6th Jagirdar of Yelandur estate.

References

1904 births
1989 deaths